Alexander Gilmore Cochran (March 20, 1846 – May 1, 1928) was an American attorney and one-term Democratic member of the U.S. House of Representatives from Pennsylvania.

Early life 
Cochran was born in Allegheny City, Pennsylvania (now part of Pittsburgh). He attended private and public schools in Pennsylvania, Phillips Academy in Andover, Massachusetts, and Columbia Law School in New York City. Cochran was admitted to the bar in 1866 and commenced practice in Pittsburgh.

Career 
Cochran was elected as a Democrat to the Forty-fourth Congress. He was an unsuccessful candidate for reelection in 1876 and so resumed the practice of law in Pittsburgh. In 1879 he moved to St. Louis, Missouri where he spent more than twenty years as general solicitor for the Missouri Pacific Railway Company and head of its legal department in the West. He also served as vice president of the Missouri Pacific and Iron Mountain Railway and as judge advocate with the rank of lieutenant colonel in the Missouri National Guard. Cochran died in St. Louis in 1928 and was interred in Bellefontaine Cemetery.

Sources

The Political Graveyard

1846 births
1928 deaths
Columbia Law School alumni
Pennsylvania lawyers
Politicians from Pittsburgh
Democratic Party members of the United States House of Representatives from Pennsylvania
19th-century American lawyers